Yopal is a municipality and capital city of the department of Casanare in Colombia.

History 
During the period of the Spanish colonization of the Americas, the land on which Yopal stands was occupied by the indigenous Achagua people. The name Yopal descends from the region's abundance of Anadenanthera peregrina, often otherwise called yopo.

Geographic information 
Population: 150 000 inhabitants
Elevation: 
Area: 
Distance from Bogotá: 
Median temperature:

Climate 
Yopal has a tropical monsoon climate (Köppen Am). Although it borders closely on a tropical savanna climate (Aw), Yopal’s climate is much more typical of a tropical monsoon climate in having a short but distinct dry season that covers the months of December to March, and a very long wet season covering the remaining eight months.

Born in Yopal 
 Jeffry Romero, professional cyclist
 Andres Badillo Entrepreneur
 Mechs, streamer of League of Legends

References

External links 
  Yopal official website
  La Voz de Yopal (Radio)

Municipalities of Casanare Department
Capitals of Colombian departments